Nguyễn Khản (1734 - 1787), courtesy name Đức Như (德如), pseudonym Thuật Hiên (述軒) or Escape Oldman at Hồng Mountain (鴻山遯翁), posthumous name Hoành-Mẫn tiên-sinh thượng-đẳng tối-linh phúc-thần (橫敏先生上等最靈福神), was an Annamese official and poet.

Biography
Nguyễn Khản was born in 1734 in Tiên Điền village, Nghi Xuân district, Đức Quang prefect, Nghệ An region of the Revival Lê dynasty. He was the first child (of 21 children) of the Chancellor Nguyễn Nghiễm. Nguyễn Khản was a child of his father's first wife (of 8 women) who has a name Đặng Thị Dương, she was the second daughter of official Đặng Sĩ Vinh.

He passed the official government examination as a Jinshi in 1760 and then became a teacher of the Crown Prince Trịnh Tông. So he changed his name as Nguyễn Hân (阮欣). In 1767, lord Trịnh Sâm changed his name as Nguyễn Lệ (阮儷). In 1778, he re-changed his name as Nguyễn Khản.

Works

Genealogy

Family
 Father : Nguyễn Nghiễm (阮儼, 1708 - 1776)
 Mother : Đặng Thị Dương (鄧氏陽 ; courtesy name Ôn 温)
 Brothers : Nguyễn Nễ, Nguyễn Du
 Sisters :

Spouse
 Đặng Thị Vệ (1736 - 1783)
 2 daughters : Nguyễn Thị Bành, Nguyễn Thị Thái
 [...] Thủy (1743 - 1780)
 3 sons : Nguyễn Tuấn, Nguyễn Lễ, Nguyễn Hân
 ?
 5 sons : Nguyễn Tiệp, Nguyễn Bằng, Nguyễn Đường, Nguyễn Đảng, Nguyễn Xưng
 3 daughters : Nguyễn Thị Xuân, Nguyễn Thị Nga, Nguyễn Thị Hương

See also
 Nguyễn Du
 Trịnh Tông
 Phạm Đình Hổ

References

 Hoan-châu Nghi-Tiên Nguyễn-gia thế-phả (驩州宜仙阮家世譜).
 Biography of Nguyễn Khản
 Nguyễn Khản's poems
 Nguyễn Khản's poems at Và Temple
 About the Lament of the soldier's wife translation of Nguyễn Khản
 Nguyễn Khản and Trịnh Sâm
 About the duke of Hoành Mẫn

1734 births
1786 deaths
People from Hà Tĩnh province
People from Hanoi
Vietnamese Confucianists
Vietnamese male poets
Lê dynasty officials
18th-century Vietnamese poets
18th-century male writers